Netherton is a hamlet in northwest Hampshire, England.  According to the Post Office the population of the 2011 Census was included in the civil parish of Faccombe.  It is the site of a late Anglo-Saxon and medieval manorial complex, the remains of which are on private property with nothing remaining above ground.

References

Hamlets in Hampshire